is a Japanese professional golfer. He won eight tournaments on the Japan Golf Tour and led the money list in 1984.

Professional wins (10)

Japan Golf Tour wins (9)

*Note: The 1982 Tohoku Classic was shortened to 54 holes due to weather.

Japan Golf Tour playoff record (1–4)

Other wins (1)
1984 Hokkoku Open

Team appearances
Nissan Cup (representing Japan): 1985

External links

Japanese male golfers
Japan Golf Tour golfers
1952 births
Living people